Yunfeng Han (born 9 October 1959) is a Dutch/Chinese businessperson. He is the President of the Hanchen Group and a successful entrepreneur in the tobacco industry. Han is also the founder of Hanchen Agriculture business cluster in Hong Kong and Cambodia. Before Han has been acting as the Managing Director of the Golden Leaf International B.V. in the Netherlands. His long career in the tobacco industry started in China National Tobacco Corporation.

Currently Yunfeng Han is working on a large-scale agricultural development program in Southeast Asia.

Sources 

1959 births
Businesspeople from Henan
Living people